Richard Irvine Bentley (1 January 1854 – 1909) was the superintendent to the British Columbia provincial Asylum for the Insane and medical officer to the New Westminster Gaol. He was also surgeon of the Royal Columbian Hospital.

References
 Biography at the Dictionary of Canadian Biography Online

19th-century Canadian physicians
1854 births
1909 deaths